State Highway 183 (SH 183) is a highway in Bent County, Colorado. SH 183's southern terminus is at County Route HH (CR HH) near Fort Lyon, and the northern terminus is at U.S. Route 50 (US 50) east of Las Animas.

Route description
SH 183 runs , starting at a junction with CR HH near Fort Lyon, which was formerly used as a prison by the Colorado Department of Corrections. The route heads north, ending at a junction with  US 50 east of Las Animas.

Major intersections

References

External links

183
State Highway 183